Marek Kuzma (born 22 June 1988) is a Slovak footballer who currently plays as a forward for Železiarne Podbrezová.

Career
On 20 July 2016, Kuzma signed with Bulgarian First League club Cherno More.  He became the team's topscorer for the 2016–17 season but left the club in May 2018 when his contract expired.

On 20 June 2018, Kuzma signed for I liga side Puszcza Niepołomice.

References

External links 
Slovan profile 

1988 births
Living people
Sportspeople from Trenčín
Association football forwards
Slovak footballers
Slovakia youth international footballers
Slovakia under-21 international footballers
FK Dubnica players
FK Dukla Banská Bystrica players
ŠK Slovan Bratislava players
1. FC Slovácko players
Spartak Myjava players
FK Iskra Borčice players
FC ViOn Zlaté Moravce players
PFC Cherno More Varna players
Puszcza Niepołomice players
ŠKF Sereď players
FK Železiarne Podbrezová players
Slovak Super Liga players
2. Liga (Slovakia) players
Czech First League players
First Professional Football League (Bulgaria) players
I liga players
Slovak expatriate footballers
Slovak expatriate sportspeople in the Czech Republic
Slovak expatriate sportspeople in Poland
Expatriate footballers in the Czech Republic
Expatriate footballers in Bulgaria
Expatriate footballers in Poland